The City of Toronto flag, often simply referred to as the flag of Toronto, is the flag adopted by Toronto City Council to represent the city. The flag was designed by Renato De Santis and includes a white outline of Toronto City Hall on a blue field, and a red maple leaf at the base of the towers.

An early flag of Toronto was adopted by the former City of Toronto in 1967 and included the city's coat of arms on a blue and white field. However, that flag was replaced by De Santis' design in 1974, which remained in use until the former City of Toronto was amalgamated in 1998. In 1999, a 1:2 proportioned version of De Santis' flag was adopted by the new City of Toronto.

Description 

The flag of Toronto includes a white outline of the twin towers of the Toronto City Hall slightly left-of-centre on a blue field. The red maple leaf from the Canadian flag sits at the base of the towers, representing the city council chambers. The shape of the space above and between the towers suggests the letter 'T', the city's initial. The design adopted by the City of Toronto in 1999 is proportioned at 1:2, although its original design created by De Santis was proportioned at 2:3.

As a municipal flag, the flag of Toronto follows the flag of Canada, the flags of other sovereign countries, and flags of provinces and territories in Canadian flag etiquette.

A variation of this flag is used by Toronto Fire Services fireboats. The marine ensign consists of the city's flag in the upper canton, with a lifebuoy on a two-tone blue background.

History

Flags of the former City of Toronto
An early flag of Toronto was designed by Eric Arthur and his son, and adopted in 1967 by the former City of Toronto. It featured the city's coat of arms imposed on a blue and white field. The design was criticized by the incumbent mayor of Toronto, William Dennison.

On 28 August 1974, a committee was appointed by Toronto City Council to design a new flag. A competition to design a new flag was launched later that year that was open to all residents of Metropolitan Toronto. More than 700 submissions were received, more than half of which incorporated a maple leaf. A flag design committee, headed by Robert Woadden of the City of Toronto Archives, was created to select submissions from the competition.

The committee eventually submitted its selection to the city council on 6 November 1974, where its members unanimously voted for a design submitted by Renato De Santis, a 21-year-old graphic design student at George Brown College. On 7 November 1974, a flag raising ceremony was conducted outside Toronto City Hall, where De Santis also received a prize of $500 for winning the competition. The flag used during the flag raising was later stolen from the flagpole.

Amalgamated Toronto

In 1997, a new design competition was launched to find a new flag for the new amalgamated City of Toronto to be formed on 1 January 1998. The design competition in 1997 laid out more specific criteria than the competition in 1974, with designs being limited to three colours and a proportion of 1:2. The competition had a prize of $3000. However, no prize was ever awarded, with city council approving none of the 161 designs submitted they received.

After the design competition, Toronto City Council asked city design staff to submit their own proposals. The council eventually selected a design recommended by councillor Brad Duguid. During the council's review of staff designs, De Santis had suggested his original design be modified to fit the 1:2 proportions desired by the city council. The two designs were put to the public during an open council meeting in November 1999, with De Santis' design being received the most favourably by the public in attendance. The council voted to adopt De Santis' modified old design by a vote of 31 to 14.

Flags of Metropolitan Toronto 

From 1954 to 1998, the former city of Toronto and its surrounding municipalities formed a part of a upper-tier municipal government known as Metropolitan Toronto.

By the end of the 1970s, Metropolitan Toronto, along with its six lower-tier municipalities, had adopted regional or municipal flags to represent their respective jurisdictions. East York was the last municipality in Metropolitan Toronto to adopt a municipal flag, having adopted a design in 1978 after holding a flag design contest.

Flag of Metropolitan Toronto

The Metropolitan Toronto government eventually adopted its own flag, which consisted of the region's six-ringed emblem on the left side, representing Metropolitan Toronto's six regions centred vertically on a blue and green background. Use of the Metropolitan Toronto flag was discontinued in 1998 with the dissolution of Metropolitan Toronto and the amalgamation of its lower-tier municipalities into the new City of Toronto.

Proposals have been made to reintroduce a modified version of the Metropolitan Toronto flag as a new flag of Toronto, with its supporters claiming the design better represents the various areas amalgamated into the city.

See also 

 List of Canadian flags
 List of city flags in North America

Notes

References

External links 

 

Flag
Flag
Flags of cities in Ontario
Toronto
Flags adopted through competition
Toronto